Marian McClure (born July 10, 1942) is a former member of the Arizona House of Representatives, initially representing the 9th District before redistricting in 2002 moved her to the 30th District. She was first elected to the House in November 2000.  She won re-election in 2002, 2004, and 2006. Due to Arizona term limits, she was ineligible to run for re-election in 2008. Instead, she ran for the Arizona State Senate, where she lost in the Republican primary to incumbent Frank Antenori, who went on to re-election in the general election.

References

Republican Party members of the Arizona House of Representatives
1942 births
Living people